The Daning River Bridge is an arch bridge near Wushan, Chongqing, China. The bridge opened in 2009 carrying traffic on the G42 Shanghai–Chengdu Expressway across the Daning River. The bridge spans  making it one of the longest arch bridges in the world. The bridge is also among the highest in the world however the reservoir created by the construction of the Three Gorges Dam has increased the height of the river below the bridge and the full  clearance is no longer visible.

See also
List of longest arch bridge spans
List of highest bridges in the world

External links
Daninghe Bridge Hurong - highestbridges.com

References

Bridges in Chongqing
Arch bridges in China
Bridges completed in 2009